The Apertura 2008 Liguilla Final was a two-legged football match-up to determine the Apertura 2008 champions. 
The series was contested between Deportivo Toluca F.C. from Toluca, Mexico State, and C.D.S.C. Cruz Azul from Mexico City, both of whom were playing in their first final against each other.

Final rules 
Like other match-ups in the knockout round, the teams will play two games, one at each team's home stadium. As the highest seeded team determined at the beginning of the Liguilla, Toluca was to have home-field advantage for the second leg. If the teams remained tied after 90 minutes of play during the 2nd leg, extra time will be used, followed by a penalty shootout if necessary.

Final summary

First leg 
The First Leg was played in front of a capacity crowd at Estadio Azul in Mexico City. Paulo da Silva opened up the scoreboard with a goal in the 14th minute followed by a superb free kick by Sergio Amaury Ponce at the 22nd minute. Cruz Azul could not find an answer in the 2nd half though they were playing better, Hernán Cristante of Toluca had a sensational game under the three posts. The final score left Toluca with a 2-goal advantage going into the next leg.

Second leg

References

Aper
2008
2008